I falsari is a 1951 Italian crime film. It is the directorial debut by Franco Rossi.

Plot 
Police inspector Moroni pretends to be a traveling salesman to unmask a gang of counterfeiters. Thus begins his investigations, which together with an anonymous letter lead him to investigate in the city of Naples.

Cast
Fosco Giachetti as Moroni
Doris Duranti as Teresa
Erno Crisa as Pietro
Lianella Carell as Lucia
Saro Urzì as Commissioner
Mario Angelotti as Nicola
Gabriele Ferzetti as Dario
Nerio Bernardi	as Maggiori
Roberto Murolo	as Singer

References

External links
 

1950 films
1950s Italian-language films
Films directed by Franco Rossi
Films scored by Carlo Rustichelli
1950 directorial debut films
Italian crime films
1950 crime films
Italian black-and-white films
1950s Italian films